Grafton Regis Meadow is a  nature reserve east of Grafton Regis in Northamptonshire. It is managed by the Wildlife Trust for Bedfordshire, Cambridgeshire and Northamptonshire.

This is a traditionally managed hay meadow on the bank of the Grand Union Canal. Birds visiting the site include curlews, lapwings, long-tailed tits, bullfinches, yellowhammers and wrens.

There is no public access to the site.

References

Wildlife Trust for Bedfordshire, Cambridgeshire and Northamptonshire reserves